Corymbia gilbertensis, commonly known as the Gilbert River ghost gum or Gilbert River box, is a species of tree that is endemic to tropical far north Queensland. It has rough, tessellated bark on the lower part of the trunk, smooth bark above, a crown of juvenile, intermediate and adult leaves, flower buds mostly in groups of seven, creamy white flowers and cup-shaped to barrel-shaped fruit.

Description
Corymbia gilbertensis is a tree that typically grows to a height  and forms a lignotuber. The crown of the tree has a mixture of juvenile, intermediate and adult leaves.

Taxonomy and naming
The Gilbert River ghost gum was first formally described in 1928 by Joseph Maiden and William Blakely in Maiden's book A Critical Revision of the Genus Eucalyptus and was given the name Eucalyptus clavigera var. gilbertensis. The type specimens were collected near the Gilbert River by Cyril Tenison White in 1922. In 1995 Ken Hill and Lawrie Johnson raised the variety to species status as Corymbia gilbertensis. The specific epithet is a reference to the type location.

Distribution and habitat
Corymbia gilbertensis grows on stony ridges and hills in woodland in isolated populations in tropical north Queensland in the Croydon and Einasleigh River districts and north of Hughenden.

Conservation status
This eucalypt is classified as of "least concern" under the Queensland Government Nature Conservation Act 1992.

See also
 List of Corymbia species

References

gilbertensis
Myrtales of Australia
Flora of Queensland
Plants described in 1928